Yard is an unincorporated community in Anderson County, in the U.S. state of Texas. According to the Handbook of Texas, the community had a population of 18 in 2000. It is located within the Palestine, Texas micropolitan area.

History
Yard was reported to get this name when the owner of the community's first store, named Bruce Gray, accidentally included a request from a customer who wanted a yard of cloth on a list of potential names to give to the post office's department when the settlement was originally part of Tennessee Colony. The post office was then established at Yard in 1903 and remained in operation until the mid-1950s. The community's population was small, with only 25 in 1925, grew to over 60 in 1949, remained over 70 in 1968. The population start falling in 1965 when many of the predominantly black families children had graduated from high school and moved to the bigger cities for jobs and higher education. It only had one operating business in 1949, and a ribbon cane sugar farm that employed a few locals. There was a syrup cake bakery on the banks oof the trinity river that sold fresh baked cakes and pies. There was a church" Friendship Missionary Baptist Church" and several homes in 1982.

Geography

Education
Public education in Yard is provided by the Cayuga Independent School District.

References

Unincorporated communities in Anderson County, Texas
Unincorporated communities in Texas